William, Willem, Will, or Bill Benson may refer to:

Sports
 Bill Benson (rugby league) (1893–1968), Australian rugby league player
 Bill Benson (ice hockey) (1920–2012), Canadian ice hockey centreman
 William Benson (swimmer) (born 1987), New Zealand swimmer
 Will Benson (born 1998), American baseball player

Others
 William Benson (abbot) (died 1549), English Benedictine
 Willem Benson (1521–1574), Flemish Renaissance painter
 William Benson (architect) (1682–1754), British amateur architect and political figure
 William Henry Benson (1803–1870), British amateur malacologist
 William Thomas Benson (1824–1885), Canadian entrepreneur and politician
 William S. Benson (1855–1932), American admiral
 William Ralganal Benson (1862–1937), Native American basket maker
 William Sol Benson (1877–1945), American esperantist, author of "Benson's Universal Method" for Esperanto's (self-)teaching
 William Noel Benson (1885–1957), Australian/New Zealand geologist

See also
 William Bentsen (1930–2020), American Olympic sailor